Ardeshir Farah is an Iranian musician and guitarist.

Early life
He was born in Tehran. Farah is half of the guitar duo Strunz & Farah.

Career
Farah's  work in Strunz & Farah earned him a Grammy Award in 1991. His works include jazz, rock and pop music. Influence of Iranian music is evident in his works. He is a pioneer in combining Iranian music with Western music.

Discography

Studio albums
 Mosaico, Jan 01, 1982 Selva
 Primal Magic, Nov 01, 1990 Selva
 Misterio, Jan 01, 1991 Valley Entertainment
 Americas, Jan 01, 1992 Selva
 Heat of the Sun, Jan 01, 1994 Selva
 Strunz & Farah: Live, Jan 01, 1997 Selva
 Wild Muse, Nov 01, 1998 Selva
 Flamenco: a Windham Hill Guitar Collection, Dec 30, 1998 BMG
 The Best of Strunz & Farah (Collection), Nov 01, 2000 Selva
 Stringweave, Jan 01, 2001 Selva
 Rio de Colores, Nov 01, 2003 Selva
 Zona Torrida, Jan 01, 2004 Selva
 Desert Guitars (Collection), Jan 01, 2005 Selva
 Desert Guitars (feat. Bijan Mortazavi, L. Subramaniam, Hayadeh & Manoochehr Sadeghi), Jan 01, 2005 Selva
 Jungle Guitars, Mar 21, 2006 Selva
 Fantaseo, Oct 17, 2006 Selva
 Journey Around the Sun, Mar 15, 2011 Selva

See also 
 Music of Iran
 List of Iranian musicians

References

External links
 

20th-century births
Iranian guitarists
Year of birth missing (living people)
Living people
Musicians from Tehran
Iranian emigrants to the United Kingdom
Iranian emigrants to the United States